Page Two is the second extended play (EP) by South Korean girl group Twice. The album was released digitally and physically on April 25, 2016, by JYP Entertainment and distributed by KT Music. It is supported by the lead single, "Cheer Up" which was produced by South Korean producing duo Black Eyed Pilseung.

Consisting of seven tracks in total which incorporates various genres including dance-pop and hip hop, the EP became a commercial success for the group, reaching over 150,000 copies sold by September 2016. It set a record for having the highest first-week sales out of all Korean girl group album releases in 2016, until it was surpassed by Twice's succeeding EP Twicecoaster: Lane 1 which was released six months later.

Background and release
On April 5, 2016, Twice released a group teaser image depicting the members wearing cheerleading outfits in an empty stadium on their official SNS accounts, revealing that their comeback was slated for April 25 with the word "#CheerUp" included in the image. JYP Entertainment announced that the group's comeback will "show an even more lively side of Twice" and further added that they will begin promotional activities for the upcoming album in the following week.

On April 12, the group confirmed that their next release will be an EP titled Page Two, and released an image of the album's track list, revealing seven songs in total with the lead single "Cheer Up". The seventh track "I'm Gonna Be a Star", which served as the theme song for Sixteen, was announced to be included only in the physical copy of the album. Contents of the physical album (which comes in two versions: pink and mint) was also revealed, and it was announced that 30,000 limited edition copies featuring a special sleeve designed by member Chaeyoung was available.

On April 18, the group released their first music video teaser for "Cheer Up", which ranked first in real-time Korean search engines. They also uploaded a group teaser image on the same day. On April 19, a second music video teaser clip which featured Nayeon, Momo, and Dahyun was uploaded. Two sets of individual teaser photos featuring the three members were also released later that day. On April 20, a third music video teaser clip featuring Jeongyeon, Jihyo, and Mina was released, alongside the two batches of their individual teaser photos. The fourth music video teaser clip which featured Sana, Chaeyoung, and Tzuyu was uploaded on April 21, along with the two batches of their individual teaser photos. On April 22, the group released a music video teaser clip featuring all the members, revealing a snippet of the title track's audio. The following day, they released another music video teaser which revealed a part of the choreography for "Cheer Up". An additional group teaser image was also released. On April 24, Twice released an album highlight medley featuring audio snippets for all tracks from the EP. They also released the online cover image for the album on the same day.

Page Two and its title track "Cheer Up" was officially released on April 25 on various Korean music portals.

Composition
The extended play's lead single, "Cheer Up", has lyrics written by Sam Lewis and music by Black Eyed Pilseung, the same team who wrote Twice's hit single "Like Ooh-Ahh" from their debut mini-album. "Cheer Up" is a dance-pop song that incorporates multiple genres, including hip hop, tropical house, and drum and bass; this blend was described as "color pop". The second track on the album is a remake of Park Ji-yoon's 1998 single, "Precious Love", written by Park Jin-young (J. Y. Park). The song was re-arranged in a house dance style with electronic instrumentation and hip hop rhythms, and features a new rap written by Chaeyoung.

"Touchdown" was described as a "powerful dance number with dynamic rhythms, melodies, and powerful sound effects". "Tuk Tok" is a dance-pop song with elements of soul and trap, inspired by the teaser video for Sixteen. "Woohoo" was described as a hip hop song with "groovy beats", and "My Headphones On" is a pop ballad about a girl's breakup. A seventh track, "I'm Gonna Be a Star" (the theme song from Sixteen) is only available on the CD version of the album.

Promotion
On April 25, 2016, Twice held a media showcase at Yes 24 Live Hall in Gwangjin-gu, Seoul. They performed "Woohoo", "Touchdown", "Precious Love" and "Cheer Up" for the first time at the showcase, which was broadcast live via Naver's V app.  The group then promoted the album with a series of televised live performances on various music shows. Their first music show appearance was on M! Countdown on April 28, where they performed "Cheer Up" and "Touchdown". The choreography for "Cheer Up" was slightly changed after Sana's "shy shy shy" line (pronounced "sha sha sha") became a viral meme. Twice won their first music show award on M! Countdown the following week on May 5, and also won on Music Bank and Inkigayo that same week. They concluded promotion for the album on May 29 with a performance on Inkigayo, winning a total of eleven music show awards. The trophy on the May 27 edition of Music Bank was initially awarded to AOA before the show's producers admitted they had miscalculated the album points.

Critical reception
Kim Hyang-min of Korea JoongAng Daily gave the album a mixed review, describing the songs as "high-spirited and cheerful" and "generally refreshing and witty" but regretting the album's lack of genre diversity. Kim noted that the tension in the title track's lyrics was "well-expressed" through its hip-hop and electronic sounds, though the song was too repetitive, and praised "Touchdown" for its "powerful sound" and energetic feeling.

Commercial performance
Page Two recorded the highest first-week sales volume for a Korean girl group in 2016 after reaching over 41,800 copies sold, which would soon be surpassed by Twice's own succeeding release Twicecoaster: Lane 1 released in October. The EP debuted at number two on the Gaon Album Chart and number six on the Billboard World Albums chart, with 80,686 units sold during the month of April. According to JYPE representatives, the pre-order of 30,000 limited edition albums was sold out before its official release. By September, the album had sold over 150,000 units.

The songs from the album also performed well digitally. "Cheer Up" charted at number one on the Gaon Digital Chart and number three on the Billboard World Digital Song Sales chart. "Precious Love" and "Touchdown" also charted on the Gaon Digital Chart, at numbers 73 and 86 respectively.

Track listing

Content production
Credits adapted from album liner notes.

 Locations
Recorded, engineered and mixed at JYP Entertainment Studios, Seoul, South Korea
Mastered at Suono Mastering, Seoul, South Korea

 Personnel

J. Y. Park – producer, all instruments (on "I'm Gonna Be a Star")
Black Eyed Pilseung – co-producer
Lee Ji-young – direction and coordination (A&R)
Jang Ha-na – music (A&R)
Kim Yeo-ju (Jane Kim) – music (A&R)
Kim Ji-hyeong – production (A&R)
Kim Hyeon-jun – production (A&R)
Kim Bo-hyeon – design (A&R)
Kim Yong-woon "goodyear" – recording and mixing engineer
Choi Hye-jin – recording engineer, assistant mixing engineer
Jang Hong-seok – assistant recording engineer
Lee Tae-seop – mixing engineer
Choi Hong-young – mastering engineer
Go Ji-seon – assistant mastering engineer
Park Nam-yong – choreographer
Yoon Hee-so – choreographer
Jang Deok-hee – photographer
Kang Hye-in – album design
Kim Jae-yoon – album design
Park Ju-hee – album design
Kim Young-jo – music video director
Yoo Seung-woo – music video director
Choi Hee-seon – style director
Im Ji-yeon – style director
Park Nae-ju – hair director
Won Jeong-yo – make-up director
Rado – all instruments and computer programming (on "Cheer Up")
Jihyo – background vocals (on "Cheer Up", "Tuk Tok", "My Headphones On" and "I'm Gonna Be a Star")
Hong Ji-sang – all instruments and computer programming (on "Precious Love")
The Karlsson's – all instruments and computer programming (on "Touchdown")
EJ Show – all instruments and computer programming (on "Touchdown")
Twice – background vocals (on "Touchdown")
Choi Jin-seok – all instruments and computer programming (on "Tuk Tok")
Daniel Kim – vocal director (on "Tuk Tok"), vocal producer (on "My Headphones On")
Gong Hyeon-sik – all instruments, computer programming and background vocals (on "Woohoo")
Jang Jun-ho – all instruments and computer programming (on "Woohoo")
Jinri – background vocals (on "Precious Love", "Woohoo")
Niclas Kings – all instruments and computer programming (on "My Headphones On")
Frants – all instruments and computer programming (on "I'm Gonna Be a Star")

Charts

Weekly charts

Year-end charts

Accolades

Release history

Notes

References

2016 EPs
JYP Entertainment EPs
Genie Music EPs
Korean-language EPs
Dance-pop EPs
Twice (group) EPs